Dasyuris enysii is a species of moth in the family Geometridae. It is endemic to New Zealand. This moth is classified as "At Risk, Naturally Uncommon" by the Department of Conservation.

Taxonomy 
This species was first described by Arthur Gardiner Butler in 1877 using specimens collected by John Enys and named Fidonia enysii. In 1884 Edward Meyrick, thinking he was describing a new species, named it Statira homomorpha. In 1885 Meyrick recognised his error and synonymised both previous names naming the species Statira enysii. In 1886 Meyrick renamed the genus Statira Stathmonyma. George Hudson described and illustrated the species under the name Dasyuris enysii both in his 1898 book New Zealand moths and butterflies (Macrolepidoptera) as well as in his 1928 publication The Butterflies and Moths of New Zealand. The type specimen of this species is held at the Natural History Museum, London.

Description 
Butler described the species as follows:

When on the wing this species can be mistaken for Paranotoreas brephosata but can be distinguished from that species as D. enysii is larger in size, has paler colouring and the antennae of the male is simpler.

Distribution 
This species is endemic to New Zealand. The range of D. enysii is Marlborough, Kaikoura and Mid Canterbury. The type locality is Castle Hill. Hudson stated that he collected specimens at the mineral belt on Dun Mountain near Nelson as well as at Mount Hutt.

Biology and life cycle 
Little is known of the biology and life cycle of this species. The adults of this species are on the wing in January and are day flying.

Host species and habitat 
The host species for the larvae of this moth is unknown but it has been hypothesised that it is likely to be a plant from the family Apiaceae. The adults of this species prefer stony mountainous habitat.

Conservation status 
This moth is classified under the New Zealand Threat Classification system as being "At Risk, Naturally Uncommon".

References

Larentiinae
Moths of New Zealand
Moths described in 1877
Endemic fauna of New Zealand
Endangered biota of New Zealand
Taxa named by Arthur Gardiner Butler
Endemic moths of New Zealand